The Texarkana and Fort Smith Railway Depot is a historic railroad station on Texarkana Avenue in Wilton, Arkansas.  Built c. 1893, this single-story wood-frame structure is the only surviving station built by the Texarkana and Fort Smith Railway, which only existed as an independent entity from 1885 to 1892.  It was originally located closer to the tracks, housing facilities for both passengers and freight, but was moved about  after its sale into private hands.  The building has architecturally distinctive Stick-style bracing in its eaves.

The building was listed on the National Register of Historic Places in 2008.

See also
National Register of Historic Places listings in Little River County, Arkansas

References

Railway stations on the National Register of Historic Places in Arkansas
Queen Anne architecture in Arkansas
Railway stations in the United States opened in 1891
National Register of Historic Places in Little River County, Arkansas
Kansas City Southern Railway stations
Former railway stations in Arkansas